"Tonight" is a pop rock song by the German band Reamonn. It was released on 7 July 2006 from their fifth studio album Wish.

Track listing
CD single
 "Tonight" — 3:36
 "Mother Earth" — 3:54

Charts performance
The song reached the top 20 in Germany (#11), on the European charts (#11), and in Switzerland (#20). It was a number-one song in Greece and Romania for six weeks.

Weekly charts

Year-end charts

See also
List of Romanian Top 100 number ones of the 2000s

References

External links 

Reamonn songs
2006 singles
Number-one singles in Romania
2006 songs
Songs written by Rea Garvey